The Center for Discrete Mathematics and Theoretical Computer Science (DIMACS) is a collaboration between Rutgers University, Princeton University, and the research firms AT&T, Bell Labs, Applied Communication Sciences, and NEC.  It was founded in 1989 with money from the National Science Foundation.  Its offices are located on the Rutgers campus, and 250 members from the six institutions form its permanent members.

DIMACS is devoted to both theoretical development and practical applications of discrete mathematics and theoretical computer science. It engages in a wide variety of evangelism including encouraging, inspiring, and facilitating researchers in these subject areas, and sponsoring conferences and workshops.

Fundamental research in discrete mathematics has applications in diverse fields including Cryptology, Engineering, Networking, and Management Decision Support.

Past directors have included Fred S. Roberts, Daniel Gorenstein, András Hajnal, and Rebecca N. Wright.

The DIMACS Challenges
DIMACS sponsors implementation challenges to determine practical algorithm performance on problems of interest.  There have been eleven DIMACS challenges so far.

 1990-1991: Network Flows and Matching
 1992-1992: NP-Hard Problems: Max Clique, Graph Coloring, and SAT
 1993-1994: Parallel Algorithms for Combinatorial Problems
 1994-1995: Computational Biology: Fragment Assembly and Genome Rearrangement
 1995-1996: Priority Queues, Dictionaries, and Multidimensional Point Sets
 1998-1998: Near Neighbor Searches
 2000-2000: Semidefinite and Related Optimization Problems
 2001-2001: The Traveling Salesman Problem
 2005-2005: The Shortest Path Problem
 2011-2012: Graph Partitioning and Graph Clustering 
 2013-2014: Steiner Tree Problems
 2020-2021: Vehicle Routing Problems

References

External links
DIMACS Website

1989 establishments in New Jersey
Combinatorics
Discrete mathematics
Rutgers University
Mathematical institutes